Heather B. Sanborn is an American attorney, business owner and politician representing District 28 (portions of the cities of Portland and Westbrook) in the Maine State Senate. Sanborn co-owns and operates Rising Tide Brewery in Portland with her husband.

Early life and education
Sanborn grew up in Portland and attended Middlebury College where she graduated summa cum laude as the salutatorian of her class in 1997. She received a Master of Science in Educational Leadership from the University of Southern Maine in 2004 and taught high school in Cape Elizabeth, Maine.

Sanborn graduated from the University of Maine School of Law in 2007 where she was the editor-in-chief of the Maine Law Review.  She worked as a law clerk to Kermit Lipez on the U.S. Court of Appeals for the First Circuit and as an associate in the litigation department at Ropes & Gray. She has served on the boards of the Portland Development Corporation  and University Credit Union.

Brewery & beer industry advocacy

Rising Tide Brewery
Sanborn and her husband, Nathan Sanborn, co-own Rising Tide Brewery in Portland, Maine, and Heather serves as the director of business operations. The brewery opened in 2010 and quickly outgrew its initial space, relocating in 2012. As of 2020, Rising Tide employs 29 people and produces 4,500 barrels of beer per year. Sanborn has served as the President of the Maine Brewers' Guild and has drawn on her law background to advocate for breweries around Maine.

2012 tasting room law
Sanborn has drawn on her legal background to advocate for state-level policy changes that benefit Maine's craft beer industry. In collaboration with the Maine Brewer's Guild, she submitted a bill to the 125th Maine Legislature that would permit breweries to sell their products on-site. At the time, breweries in Maine were only permitted to give away small samples of their products, a business model which Sanborn and other industry leaders argued was not conducive to customer interaction and beer tourism. The bill, LD #1889, was signed into law in April 2012.

Political career
Sanborn ran unopposed for the 2016 Maine House of Representatives District 43 Democratic primary, and defeated Republican opponent Jeffrey Langholtz 65%-35% in the general election.

In June 2018, Sanborn won a contested primary against Portland City Councilor Jill Duson.

Sanborn ran unopposed in both the Democratic primary and in the general election in 2020 and was therefore elected to her second term representing District 28 in the Maine Senate.

Electoral record

Maine State House

Maine State Senate

External links
Senator Heather Sanborn on Facebook
Sen. Heather Sanborn, Maine.gov
Campaign website
Rising Tide Brewing
Heather Sanborn at Maine Live

References

Year of birth missing (living people)
Living people
Middlebury College alumni
University of Southern Maine alumni
University of Maine School of Law alumni
Businesspeople from Portland, Maine
Maine lawyers
Politicians from Portland, Maine
Democratic Party members of the Maine House of Representatives
Democratic Party Maine state senators
21st-century American politicians
Women state legislators in Maine
21st-century American women politicians